Andy Newton-Lee is a British actor best known for playing the role of Robbie Flynn in Channel 4's soap opera Hollyoaks. Newton-Lee attended Malet Lambert Secondary School in Hull, Yorkshire, England, where he grew up.

Career 
He first came to Note on the 2004 Christmas Single Boys and Girls (Xmas Time Love) alongside The Cheeky Girls a cash-In festive rehash of that summers big euro-pop hit Summertime love it cracked the top 50, but signaled The end of the cheeky girls run of hits to date.

He later joined the cast of Hollyoaks with the characters Mel Burton and Joe Spencer. [1]His other acting roles include parts in Coronation Street, Casualty, Doctors and Where the Heart Is.[2]

He featured on ITV's The Mint game show in December 2006 to promote his Christmas pantomime playing Dick Whittington in Blackpool. [3]

He appeared in the acclaimed British continuing drama Casualty on 22 March. He played the character of a loveable rogue, always with an idea about how to make a quick buck.[4] He was punched by another mourner at Abs' brother's funeral which made him fall through a table. It was later revealed that his character, Stacey, was an alcoholic and Abs tried to help him, ending in Abs setting up an alcohol clinic in Holby General.

Newton-Lee was interviewed on ITV's Loose Women on 11 June 2009 to discuss the death of his character Stacey after an eight-month-long story line which gained critical acclaim.[1]

Andy also has an extensive voice reel and has appeared in many cartoons, TV and namely, was the voice of Orlando Bloom in Celebrity Deathmatch and the voice of E! Network UK on all international platforms of Extreme Close up.

Personal life 
In 2005 Andy was diagnosed with stage 3 malignant melanoma in both legs which led him to becoming an ambassador for Cancer Research UK, raising awareness about these types of skin cancer in men. Through this, Andy became involved in charity runs. He has successfully completed 13 marathons, 7 half marathons all over the world including London, LA, Sydney, New York and Newcastle.  Andy was also invited to visited the Houses of Parliament by Sian James MP to address a panel of experts to discuss the growing concerns of skin cancers in men.

After 12 years in LA, Andy has moved back to the UK to relaunch the London office. In 2017 he was honoured by his home town of Hull in the Hull City of Culture 2017 Light Show, as an iconic face of Hull.

In 2018 he took part in the Hull Marathon but was disqualified due to wearing headphones throughout the race, contrary to the race rules.  He was one of 2 runners disqualified for this reason. He was disqualified for failing to follow the UK Athletics rules which ban headphones during such races run on open roads with live traffic.  The Hull route crosses points where live traffic crosses at manned points and in 2018 there were reported incidents of abusive drivers on the route leading to injuries to those working on the event.

After living in LA for 6 years, Andy became first port of call for many artists who wanted to relocate to the US and he set up his own business, a relocation company Next Stop LAX that specializes in the processing of visas for entertainment professionals and entrepreneurs. Some of the clients include Ruby Rose, Tulisa, Natalie Imbruglia and Matt Lucas among others. Next Stop LAX is now on international level and Andy has spoken at seminars all over the world including Vancouver, Toronto, London, Sydney, Melbourne, Brisbane and Manchester. Next Stop LAX is now one of the leading visa consulting agencies in the US.

Andy is currently working on writing his own sitcom and has created a parody show called 'British Andy', starring many British 'celebrity' guests.

References

External links
 

Year of birth missing (living people)
Living people
British male television actors
Place of birth missing (living people)